A Football Life is an American documentary series of 116 episodes, developed by NFL Films and aired on NFL Network that documents the lives of select National Football League (NFL) players, coaches, owners, and teams. Friends, teammates, family members and other players and coaches associated with the subjects are interviewed.

History
The name of the series originated in a quote from Steve Sabol of NFL Films:

Originating as an NFL Network special on the career of Bill Parcells in November 2010, it premiered as an episodic series on September 15, 2011, with the first part of Bill Belichick's documentary. Unlike most episodes, the episode on Belichick was a two-hour documentary, and focused specifically on the 2009 season; Belichick agreed to be wired for sound for the entire season. The documentary was viewed by about 657,000 viewers, the most-watched documentary in NFL Network's history, and was the second-most watched program in Boston at the time with 151,000 viewers, trailing behind a Boston Red Sox game.

Season Two began on September 12, 2012, with The Faces of Tebow.

The series was nominated for an Emmy Award for "Outstanding Edited Sports Series/Anthology" and "Outstanding Promotional Announcement – Episodic" for Belichick's episode in 2012.

Season One was eventually released on DVD.

Episodes

Season One
Source:

Season Two
Source:

Season Three
Source:

Season Four
Season Four was announced for September 10, 2014.

Season Five
Season Five began on September 18 at 9 pm, and it had 13 new episodes including Terrell Owens, Dick Vermeil, Paul Brown, and more.

Season Six
Season Six premiered Friday, September 16 at 9:00 PM ET and aired 13 new episodes starting with the story of Pro Football Hall of Fame running back Curtis Martin, and including Brett Favre, Chuck Noll, and Jim Brown.

Two mini-episodes were released on the NFL's official YouTube channel. In contrast to the television series, these two episodes feature fictional characters Rod Tidwell and Frank Cushman from the movie Jerry Maguire, with Cuba Gooding, Jr. and Jerry O'Connell reprising their roles. The Tidwell episode used footage from the film, while Cushman's used edited footage of Brian Griese from the NFL Films archives.

Season Seven
Season Seven of A Football Life premiered on Friday, September 15 at 9:00 PM ET and subsequently aired 13 episodes beginning with the former Miami Dolphins quarterback Dan Marino. Other episodes featured former Oakland Raiders coach John Madden, former Buffalo Bills quarterback Jim Kelly, Dallas Cowboys owner Jerry Jones and former Washington Redskins coach and current NASCAR owner Joe Gibbs.

Season Eight 
Season Eight of A Football Life premiered on Friday, September 14, 2018 at 9:00 PM ET and subsequently aired 11 episodes. It featured Mike Holmgren, Dwight Clark and The Catch, Lawrence Taylor, Thurman Thomas, Carson Palmer, Brian Dawkins, Doug Williams, Willie McGinest, Cris Collinsworth, Tony Romo and Bill Cowher

Season Nine
Season Nine premiered on Friday September 13, 2019, and the episodes included Hall of Famers Terry Bradshaw, Tony Gonzalez, Bruce Smith, Ronnie Lott.

Season Ten
Season Ten premiered on September 17, 2021.

Season Eleven
Season 11 premiered on September 16, 2022.

References

English-language television shows
NFL Network original programming
2010s American documentary television series
2011 American television series debuts
Documentary television series about sports
NFL Films